PS75 is an experimental analgesic drug which acts as a functionally selective alpha-2A adrenergic agonist, with a Ki of 8.2nM and an EC50 of 4.8nM at the α2A receptor. In animal studies it was found to produce analgesia but without the sedation typical of older drugs acting at this target such as dexmedetomidine. While PS75 itself is unlikely to be developed for medical use, the successful separation of analgesia from sedative effects makes it likely that related compounds may be developed as non-sedating, nonopioid analgesic medications.

References 

Alpha-2 adrenergic receptor agonists
Naphthalenes
Secondary amines
Chloroarenes
4-Pyridyl compounds